The 1968–69 Santosh Trophy was the 25th edition of the Santosh Trophy, the main State competition for football in India. It was held from 23 February to 29 March 1969 in Bangalore, Karnataka. The home team Mysore beat Bengal 1–0 in the final.

Group stage

Knockout stage 
Madras entered the quarter-finals after its victory against Assam in the group stage. However, Bengal and Punjab made the quarter-finals after their wins over Tripura and Bihar respectively in the pre-quarter-finals.

Pre-quarter-finals

Quarter-finals 

Replay

Second replay

Semi-finals 
The semi-finals were played in two legs; all games including the final were played at the Sree Kanteerava Stadium in Bangalore. The first semi-final was played between Mysore and Madras. After the two legs ended with the teams level at a 3–3 aggregate, a coin toss was held to decide the team that would progress to the Final. A confusion followed with both captains claiming to have won the toss, before the tournament committee of the Mysore State Football Association and officials of the All India Football Federation decided that another match be played to decide the victor. Madras withdrew protesting their decision for the replay which meant Mysore went through to the Final. The Madras Football Association stated that the "replay is against the rules of the championship and in spite of the fact that the Madras captain called correctly during the toss of the coin..." It further added, "It may be mentioned that the rules of the championship do not provide for a toss but only for a draw of lots." The second semi-final was played between Bengal and Maharashtra. Both legs ended in 1–1 draws, and Bengal proceeded to the Final after a lot was drawn in their favour.

First leg

Second leg

Final
The Final was contested by Mysore and Bengal on 26 March 1969. The match ended in a goalless draw and was replayed on 29 March. The replay which was announced to be played on 30 March was later brought back by a day. Mysore won the replay 1–0 with Doraiswamy Nataraj scoring for them in the 67th minute.

Replay

References

1968–69 in Indian football
Santosh Trophy seasons